Kassari Chapel is a chapel on the island of Kassari in Hiiu County, Estonia, thought to date to the 18th century.

Kassari Chapel is the only functioning stone church in Estonia with a thatched roof.  Major repair work bearing the date 1801 on an inner wall suggests that the current chapel was built in the 18th century, probably replacing a wooden structure dating to the 16th century.

Members of the Stackelberg family who owned the Kassari estate are buried in the chapel's graveyard, which also houses the tomb of  Villem Tamm, Johann Köler's model for the figure of Christ in his mural "Come to Me" in Charles' Church (Kaarli kirik), Tallinn.

Gallery

References
Kassari kabel Hiiumaa turismilehel (in Estonian)
Kabel Teeliste kirikute leheküljel (in Estonian)
Kabel puhkaeestis.ee lehel (in Estonian)
Kassari Chapel, Estonia

External links

Cemeteries in Estonia
Lutheran churches in Estonia
Thatched buildings
Hiiumaa Parish
Buildings and structures in Hiiu County
18th-century churches in Estonia
18th-century establishments in Estonia
Tourist attractions in Hiiu County